.ga is the country code top-level domain (ccTLD) for Gabon.

History
Between 1998 and 2004 it was administered by the Office des Postes et Télécommunications de la République Gabonaise and then transferred to Gabon Telecom. Gabon Telecom in 2013 formed a partnership with international domain registrar Freenom to offer registrations of this domain for free.

Since 2013, the Agence Nationale des Infrastructures Numériques et des Fréquences (ANINF) of Gabon is responsible for the .ga domain.

Denial of Registration to Kim Dotcom 
Kim Dotcom attempted to use me.ga as an alternative domain for the Megaupload service. It was suspended by Communications Minister Blaise Louembe who stated "Gabon cannot serve as a platform or screen for committing acts aimed at violating copyrights, nor be used by unscrupulous people."

Non-conventional naming
Some entities are named using these informal conventions:
 amb-name.ga – embassies
 ch-name.ga or chu-name.ga – hospitals
 ot-name.ga – tourism offices
 univ-name.ga – universities
 cci-name.ga – companies house
 mairie-name.ga – city halls

Second-level domain names

 .gouv.ga – government
 .org.ga – international organizations
 .co.ga – commercial organizations
 .edu.ga, .ed.ga, ac.ga, or univ.ga – schools, universities, academies

References

External links
 Redelegation of the .GA domain representing Gabon to Agence Nationale des Infrastructures Numériques et des Fréquences. Report of the Internet Assigned Numbers Authority from 29 March 2013.
 IANA .ga whois information

Country code top-level domains
Communications in Gabon

sv:Toppdomän#G